Sven Hanson (born 25 July 1941) is a Swedish sailor. He competed in the Dragon event at the 1968 Summer Olympics.

He sailed in a three person Keelboat and got ranked 6th.

References

External links
 

1941 births
Living people
Swedish male sailors (sport)
Olympic sailors of Sweden
Sailors at the 1968 Summer Olympics – Dragon
Sportspeople from Gothenburg
20th-century Swedish people